Marek Majka (born 5 January 1959) is a Polish football manager and former player who played as a winger.

References

1959 births
Living people
Polish footballers
Association football wingers
Piast Gliwice players
Górnik Zabrze players
SC Freiburg players
Odra Wodzisław Śląski players
Carbo Gliwice players
Ekstraklasa players
I liga players
2. Bundesliga players
Polish expatriate footballers
Expatriate footballers in Germany
Polish expatriate sportspeople in Germany
Polish football managers
Piast Gliwice managers